The Deutsch-Ostafrikanische Zeitung was a weekly German language newspaper published between 1899 and 1916 in Dar al-Salaam, German East Africa.

Its founder was Willy von Roy. The first issue was printed on February 26, 1899. In 1902 the edition was 1000 copies.

History 
In 1907, German settlers in Tanga in the Usambara Post attacked the colonial policy of Governor Albrecht von Rechenberg. The latter then instructed his officials not to support the newspaper published in the state German school of Tanga sheet, after which the newspaper was set. Willy von Roy declared his solidarity with the settlers and let print the Usaramo post office for three months for the vacant market.

Albrecht von Rechenberg, who wanted to promote African agriculture and a Euro-Indian merchant class, rejected an intensification of immigration from Europe and a promotion of German agriculture in East Africa. He showed little sympathy for German Colonial Society, but was open to African cultures, including languages. In contrast, the Deutsch-Ostafrikanische Zeitung represented the position of the German-born settlers.

A popular topic of the Deutsch-Ostafrikanische Zeitung was the confrontation with the northern neighbors, the Maasai. The newspaper quoted affirmatively Bishop Jean-Joseph Hirth (1854-1931) from Ukara, according to which the peace in the country could not be restored until the last Maasai was exterminated.

The German-East African government had the German-East African Rundschau relocated to promote government policy. The first issue appeared on August 22, 1908, but was not bought by the German settlers.

The government withdrew the 250 German government subscriptions from the Deutsch-Ostafrikanische Zeitung, did not print any more official advertisements, and took the concession to print the Official Gazette of German East Africa as well as Der Pflanzer.

Von Roy then published printed matter with similar-sounding names:  Official Advertisements for German East Africa  and  The German East African Planter  (first edition June 19, 1909).

Passavant, a journalist of the German East African Rundschau, researched that in 1899 a punishment had been imposed on Roy in a Bagatellsache. As a result, the German East African Newspaper reported that von Rechenberg had a homosexual relationship with one of his servants. Roy was sentenced in November 1910 by a court for [halitosis] to half a year in custody and deportation to the German Reich. Wilhelm II lifted the prison sentence, but not the expulsion from German East Africa.
Von Roy appointed Alfred Zintgraff as publisher for the  Deutsch-Ostafrikanische Zeitung  in 1911. Zintgraff founded the Deutsch-Ostafrikanische Zeitungs G.m.b.H. Zintgraff Wilhelm Föllmer, chairman of the German Colonial Association, made the chairman of the supervisory board. Rechenberg was replaced in October 1911, and the  German East African newspaper  could from the bankruptcy estate  German East African Rundschau  of  The Planter  and  Official Gazette for German East Africa ' 'Admit Advertisers and Subscription s.

When Dar es Salaam was occupied by the British Army during World War I, the newspaper relocated its printing site to Morogoro, where the latest issue appeared in August 1916.

References

External links 
Complete archive at the Berlin State Library

Newspapers established in 1899
Publications disestablished in 1916
German-language newspapers published in Africa
1890s establishments in German East Africa
1916 disestablishments in German East Africa
Newspapers published in Tanzania